Roula Khalaf is a British-Lebanese journalist who is the editor of the Financial Times, having been its deputy editor and foreign editor. She succeeded Lionel Barber as editor on 20 January 2020.

Early life
Khalaf was born in Beirut, Lebanon, and grew up there during the civil war. She earned a bachelor's degree from the S. I. Newhouse School of Public Communications at Syracuse University, and a master's degree in international affairs from Columbia University in New York City.

Career
Khalaf began her career as a staff writer for Forbes magazine in New York, and worked for the magazine for about four years.

She has worked for the FT since 1995, first as North Africa correspondent, then Middle East correspondent, Middle East editor and as foreign editor. In 2016, she was promoted to be deputy editor of the Financial Times. In addition to her deputy editor responsibilities, she writes and comments regularly on world affairs, Middle East politics and business.

Following the announcement that Lionel Barber would step down as editor of the paper in January 2020, it was announced that Khalaf would succeed him in that post. She is the first female editor in the 131-year history of Financial Times. On the 7 October 2022, Khalaf published an exclusive interview she secured as editor of the FT, with the Tesla Chief, Elon Musk in which he explained his future plans for Twitter, Tesla and his SpaceX project.

Awards
In 2009, Khalaf won The Peace Through Media Award of the International Media Awards "in recognition of her high standards of reporting and the quality of her news analysis". 
In 2011, she was shortlisted for the Foreign Reporter of the Year category of the Press Awards.
In 2012, she was shortlisted for the One World Media Awards for her article, The Muslim Sisterhood.

In 2013, she received, with her Financial Times colleagues Abigail Fielding-Smith, Camilla Hall and Simeon Kerr, the Foreign Press Association media award Print and Web Feature Story of the Year for Qatar: From Emirate to Empire.

In popular culture
Khalaf is quoted in Jordan Belfort's The Wolf of Wall Street; "The press onslaught had started in 1991, when an insolent reporter from Forbes magazine, Roula Khalaf, coined me as a twisted version of Robin Hood, who robs from the rich and gives to himself and his merry band of brokers. She deserved an A for cleverness, of course."

Personal life
She is married to the Lebanese businessman Assaad W. Razzouk.

References

External links
Profile at The Financial Times
C-SPAN Interview of Roula Khalaf July 2009

Living people
Syracuse University alumni
School of International and Public Affairs, Columbia University alumni
Writers from Beirut
Year of birth missing (living people)
Financial Times editors
British people of Lebanese descent